The Aphrodite Inheritance is a BBC television series broadcast in 1979.

The eight-part serial, written by Michael J. Bird, followed his previous successful Mediterranean-set series The Lotus Eaters and Who Pays the Ferryman?. Whereas the two previous productions had been set and filmed in Crete, the action (and location filming) in The Aphrodite Inheritance took place in Cyprus.

The series starred Peter McEnery as a man visiting Cyprus to investigate the death of his brother and subsequently being drawn into a strange conspiracy, with the narrative twists of the serial employing various supernatural and mythological motifs. Other major cast members included Alexandra Bastedo, Brian Blessed, Paul Maxwell and Stefan Gryff.

Credits

Main cast
Peter McEnery as David Collier
Alexandra Bastedo as Helene
Stefan Gryff as Charalambos
Paul Maxwell as Eugene Hellman
Brian Blessed as Basileos
Godfrey James as Inspector Dimas
Tony Doyle as Martin Preece
William Wilde as Eric Morrison
Ray Jewers as Olsen
Karl Held as Travis

Crew
 Series Created & Written by: Michael J. Bird
 Produced by: Andrew Osborn
 Directed by: Terence Williams (eps. 1-4) & Viktors Ritelis (eps. 5-8)
 Designed by: Jon Pusey
 Theme music composed by: George Kotsonis

Episodes

References

External links
 Michael J. Bird Tribute Site
 Review, pictures and clips from the show
 * 

Aphrodite Inheritance, The
Aphrodite
Aphrodite
English-language television shows
1970s British drama television series